USS Dallas (SSN-700) is a  nuclear-powered attack submarine of the United States Navy. She was the Navy's second vessel of that name, and the first to be named after the city of Dallas, Texas, although another two ships were scheduled but never completed. On 4 April 2018, after nearly 37 years of commissioned service, the boat was decommissioned at the Controlled Industrial Area of Puget Sound Naval Shipyard. The defueled vessel will eventually undergo recycling.

Service history
The contract to build Dallas was awarded to the Electric Boat Division of General Dynamics Corporation in Groton, Connecticut, on 31 October 1973 and her keel was laid down on 9 October 1976. She was launched on 28 April 1979 sponsored by Mrs. Rita Crocker Clements, wife of former Deputy Secretary of Defense Bill Clements, and commissioned on 18 July 1981 with then-Commander Donald R. Ferrier in command. Dallas was the first submarine of the Los Angeles class to be originally built with an all-digital fire control (tracking and weapon) system and sonar system.

After commissioning, Dallas was attached to Submarine Development Squadron 12 in New London, Connecticut, where she was involved in research and development projects. From September 1988 Dallas was a member of Submarine Squadron 2, New London. During her time with Squadron 2, she completed the first ever Depot Modernization Period and various overseas deployments.

Dallas completed an Engineered Refueling Overhaul (ERO) at the Portsmouth Naval Shipyard in Kittery, Maine, in 1998. The D1G-2 core was replaced with a D2W core. Dallas has had a removable Dry Deck Shelter for over a decade. This large chamber, fitted aft of the sail, has an array of air, water and hydraulic systems that allow Dallas to employ the Swimmer Delivery Vehicle, a highly mobile and virtually undetectable means of carrying out special forces missions.

Dallas has completed one deployment to the Indian Ocean, four Mediterranean Sea deployments, two Persian Gulf deployments, and seven deployments to the North Atlantic.

On 27 August 1981 Dallas damaged her lower rudder when she ran aground while approaching the Atlantic Undersea Test and Evaluation Center site at Andros Island, Bahamas. The submarine worked herself free after several hours and returned on the surface to New London, Connecticut, for repairs.

Museum and delayed inactivation

Naval Sea Systems Command, the city of Dallas and the Dallas Navy League began discussions in 2008 for items from the boat in support of a memorial. These will become available during the actual vessel recycling phase, which is scheduled for 2023 for Dallas.
Originally, it was planned to decommission Dallas in September 2014. Mayor Mike Rawlings and members of a foundation formed to create the new facility revealed one of their goals is to acquire and display Dallas next to a  museum building.

In 2013, the US Navy announced that the plan to retire Dallas had been extended to Fiscal Year 2017 and that instead,  would begin inactivation in early 2015. The US Navy projected to save $10 million in Pre-Inactivation Restricted Availability (PIRA) costs as a result of the change.

The Dallas Maritime Museum, to be located along the banks of the Trinity River, is planned to contain some components of the original boat, such as her sail, although there is some discussion about moving the entire submarine to the museum if the money can be raised.

The Dallas Navy League had planned to host the four-day inactivation ceremony, to take place in Galveston, Texas, on 7 April 2017. The Navy League subsequently reported that this public relations event was canceled by the US Navy, citing "budgetary constraints" while operating under a continuing resolution. Additionally, costs to the City of Dallas and/or the US Navy from leasing back already-allocated pier space were judged as excessive. The requirement to compensate commercial shipping companies for their already-reserved commercial pier space resulted from the Navy's on-again/off-again planning cycle for the inactivation ceremony, which ultimately was re-canceled.

Awards 
Dallas received two Meritorious Unit Commendations, two Navy Unit Commendations and was awarded the Battle Efficiency E for FY 1986, 1991, 1992, 1993, 1999, 2000 and 2013. Further recognition includes nomination for the 1993 Battenberg Cup as the best all-around ship in the fleet and the 1999 Engineering "E" and Medical "M".

In fiction 

Dallas features prominently in the 1984 Tom Clancy novel The Hunt for Red October and its 1990 film adaptation.
Dallas is featured along with her sister boat  in the John Ringo novel Under a Graveyard Sky.
Dallas is featured in the popular 2009 video game Call of Duty: Modern Warfare 2 in the mission "The Only Easy Day... Was Yesterday", alongside  when they were part of the Sixth Fleet.

References

External links

Los Angeles-class submarines
Cold War submarines of the United States
Nuclear submarines of the United States Navy
Ships built in Groton, Connecticut
1979 ships
Submarines of the United States